Victor Rollin Carlsson (born August 14, 1989) is a Swedish ice hockey player who plays with SønderjyskE Ishockey of the Metal Ligaen.

Rollin Carlsson made his Swedish Hockey League debut playing with Brynäs IF during the 2013–14 SHL season.

References

External links

1989 births
Living people
Swedish ice hockey centres
Sportspeople from Uppsala